Omoglymmius sabah is a species of beetle in the subfamily Rhysodinae. It was described by R.T. Bell & J.R. Bell in 1993. It is known from Mount Kinabalu in Sabah, Malaysian Borneo.

Omoglymmius sabah measure  in length.

References

sabah
Beetles of Asia
Insects of Malaysia
Endemic fauna of Borneo
Endemic fauna of Malaysia
Beetles described in 1993